The Reservation River is a river of Minnesota.  It lies in the far northeast corner of the state, near the border with Canada. It flows  from Swamp Lake on the western edge of the Grand Portage Indian Reservation south to Lake Superior.

See also
List of rivers of Minnesota

References

External links
Minnesota Watersheds
USGS Hydrologic Unit Map - State of Minnesota (1974)

Rivers of Minnesota
Tributaries of Lake Superior
Rivers of Cook County, Minnesota